Dinopeter Jude Airaodion (born 24 November 1992) is a Nigerian footballer who plays as a winger for Al Nasr Benghazi in the Libyan Premier League. He previously played for the Egyptian Premier League side ENPPI SC.

Career
Dinopeter Jude Airaodion began playing football with local side Nifor FC.  Midway through the 2015 season, he joined Northern Cyprus side Türk Ocağı.
He signed for Mağusa TG on Mid-season of 2018 until 2020 in Cyprus.

ENPPI
On 1 November 2020, Dinopeter signed a three-year contract with ENPPI SC ahead of the 2020-21 season. His debut came against Misr El Makasa on 18 December 2020 .
He made a total of 49 appearances and scored 8 goals for  ENPPI SC.

Al Nasr Benghazi
On September 29, 2022,  he signed with Libyan Premier League  side Al Nasr Benghazi  on free transfer.

References

External links 
 
 

1992 births
Living people
Al-Nasr SC (Benghazi) players
Nigerian footballers
Nigerian expatriate footballers
Expatriate footballers in Northern Cyprus
Nigerian expatriate sportspeople in Northern Cyprus
Expatriate footballers in Egypt
Nigerian expatriate sportspeople in Egypt
Expatriate footballers in Libya
Nigerian expatriate sportspeople in Libya
Libyan Premier League players